WKOZ (1340 The Groove) was a radio station broadcasting a Rhythm and Blues format. Licensed to Kosciusko, Mississippi, United States, the station was owned by Boswell Media, which acquired the station in 2006.

On July 13, 2012, WKOZ ceased broadcasting after 65 years on the air. On August 6, 2012, the FCC canceled the license for WKOZ, at the request of Boswell Media.

References

External links

KOZ
Defunct radio stations in the United States
Radio stations established in 1947
Radio stations disestablished in 2012
1947 establishments in Mississippi
2012 disestablishments in Mississippi
KOZ
Kosciusko, Mississippi